Rahamat Riga Mustapha (born 10 October 1981) is a Ghanaian-born Dutch professional footballer who last played as a striker for Pune F.C. in the Indian I-League.

Club career
Born in Accra, Ghana, Mustapha began his career with Eredivisie side Vitesse as a youth and senior player. While with the Vitesse youth team, Mustapha actually worked under his future head coach at Sparta Rotterdam and Pune, Mike Snoei. He also went out on loan to RBC Roosendaal while with Vitesse. He then left Vitesse in 2003 to sign for Sparta Rotterdam in the Eerste Divisie. In his two seasons at Sparta, Mustapha scored a total of 30 goals.

In 2005 Mustapha left Sparta Rotterdam and the Netherlands to sign for Levante UD of the Segunda División on a free transfer. Mustapha stayed at the club till 2008 when he signed for Bolton Wanderers of the Premier League in England as a replacement for the departing El Hadji Diouf. However, after two and half seasons of failing to make an impact at Bolton, Mustapha was released by the club in January 2011 and eventually signed back in the Segunda División for Cartagena.

Pune
On 26 October 2013, after two seasons away from competitive football action, Mustapha signed for Pune F.C. of the I-League in India as a replacement for injured striker Raúl Fabiani. The move meant that he would reunite with his former coach Mike Snoei who is the current head coach of Pune. He made his debut for his new side on 2 November 2013 in a league match against Sporting Goa at the Duler Stadium. He played the full 90 minutes for Pune as the side went down 2–0. He then scored his first goal for Pune, and his career first since the 2007–08 La Liga season, against Salgaocar on 22 November 2013 from the penalty spot in the 60th minute to lead Pune to a 1–1 draw in the league. His second goal then came in the very next match against Dempo on 27 November 2013 in which his 51st-minute strike lead Pune to another 1–1 draw.

Then, in the month of December, Mustapha managed to find the net three times. His first goal that month came on the 11th against Rangdajied United in which he found the net in the 23rd minute to give Pune a 1–0 lead which they would eventually give up and lose 3–2. He then scored his second and third goals in the very next match against United in which his brace lead Pune to a 2–1 victory and a "man of the match" award for Mustapha.

International career
Despite being born in Ghana, Mustapha has in the past represented the national youth teams of the Netherlands for over 90 times, making him one of few to have reached that mark.

Career statistics

References

1981 births
Living people
Footballers from Accra
Dutch footballers
SBV Vitesse players
RBC Roosendaal players
Sparta Rotterdam players
Levante UD footballers
Bolton Wanderers F.C. players
FC Cartagena footballers
Pune FC players
Association football forwards
Eredivisie players
Eerste Divisie players
Segunda División players
La Liga players
Premier League players
I-League players
Netherlands youth international footballers
Dutch expatriate footballers
Dutch expatriate sportspeople in Spain
Expatriate footballers in Spain
Expatriate footballers in England
Expatriate footballers in India
Ghanaian emigrants to the Netherlands